The 2022 The Women's Hospital Classic was a professional tennis tournament played on outdoor hard courts. It was the twenty-third edition of the tournament which was part of the 2022 ITF Women's World Tennis Tour. It took place in Evansville, Indiana, United States between 18 and 24 July 2022.

Champions

Singles

  Ashlyn Krueger def.  Sachia Vickery, 6–3, 7–5

Doubles

  Kolie Allen /  Ava Markham def.  Kylie Collins /  Ashlyn Krueger 3–6, 6–1, [10–3]

Singles main draw entrants

Seeds

 1 Rankings are as of 11 July 2022.

Other entrants
The following players received wildcards into the singles main draw:
  Kolie Allen
  Eryn Cayetano
  Hina Inoue
  Peyton Stearns

The following players received entry into the singles main draw using a protected ranking:
  Emiliana Arango

The following players received entry from the qualifying draw:
  Reese Brantmeier
  Victoria Duval
  Hiroko Kuwata
  Ma Yexin
  Maegan Manasse
  Ava Markham
  Christina Rosca
  Chanelle Van Nguyen

References

External links
 2022 The Women's Hospital Classic at ITFtennis.com

2022 ITF Women's World Tennis Tour
2022 in American tennis
July 2022 sports events in the United States